is a Japanese professional footballer who plays as a midfielder for Blaublitz Akita.

Career statistics

Club
.

Notes

References

External links

1997 births
Living people
Japanese footballers
Association football midfielders
Fukushima United FC players
Blaublitz Akita players
J2 League players
J3 League players